Neohydatothrips samayunkur, the marigold thrips, is a species of thrips in the family Thripidae. It is found in Africa, Australia, Europe and Northern Asia (excluding China), Central America, and North America.

Taxonomic note:
Intercepted at a U.S. quarantine port.

References

 Nakahara, Sueo (1999). "Validation of Neohydatothrips samayunkur (Kudo) (Thysanoptera: Thrypidae) for a Thrips Damaging Marigolds (Tagetes spp.)". Proceedings of the Entomological Society of Washington, vol. 101, no. 2, 458-459.
 Nickle, David A. (2003). "A checklist of commonly intercepted thrips (Thysanoptera) from Europe, the Mediterranean, and Africa at U. S. ports-of-entry (1983-1999), Part 1: Key to genera". Proceedings of the Entomological Society of Washington, vol. 105, no. 1, 80-99.

Further reading

 Arnett, Ross H. (2000). American Insects: A Handbook of the Insects of America North of Mexico. CRC Press.

External links

 NCBI Taxonomy Browser, Neohydatothrips samayunkur

Thripidae
Insects described in 1995